This is a List of archives in Sri Lanka

National
 The National Archives of Sri Lanka
 National Museum Library
 National Film, Television and Sound Archives
 National Library of Sri Lanka

Universities
 Permanent Reference Collection, University of Colombo
 University library, University of Moratuwa
 Rajarata University of Sri Lanka 
 University of Sri Jayewardenepura
 Library, University of Ruhuna

See also
 List of archives

References

Sri Lanka
 
Sri Lanka history-related lists
Sri Lanka education-related lists